This is a timeline of the 2006 Lebanon War during mid August.

August 10

August 11

August 12

August 13

August 14

August 15

August 16

August 17

August 18

August 19

References	 

52. LebanonWire: Why Hezbollah LOST the War in Lebanon!, LebanonWire, 2007-09-24.

2006 Lebanon War
2006 Lebanon War (mid August)